Shunting yard may refer to:

 Classification yard
 Shunting yard algorithm
 British term for rail yard